In the United States, an American Indian tribe, Native American tribe, Alaska Native village, tribal nation, or similar concept is any extant or historical clan, tribe, band, nation, or other group or community of Native Americans in the United States. Modern forms of these entities are often associated with land or territory of an Indian reservation. "Federally recognized Indian tribe" is a legal term of art in United States law with a specific meaning.

An Indian tribe recognized by the United States government usually possesses tribal sovereignty, a "dependent sovereign nation" status with the Federal Government that is similar to that of a state in some situations, and that of a nation in others. Depending on the historic circumstances of recognition, the degree of self-government and sovereignty varies somewhat from one tribal nation to another.

Legal definition in the United States
The term tribe is defined in the United States for some federal government purposes to include only tribes that are federally recognized by the Bureau of Indian Affairs (BIA), established pursuant to the Alaska Native Claims Settlement Act [43 U.S.C. 1601 et seq.]. Such tribes, including Alaska Native village or regional or village corporations recognized as such, are known as "federally recognized tribes" and are eligible for special programs and services provided by the United States. The BIA, part of the US Department of the Interior, issues Certificate of Degree of Indian Blood, which tribes use as a basis for tribal enrollment.

Some tribes, such as the United Houma Nation, do not have federal recognition, but are recognized at the state level using procedures defined by various states, without regard to federal recognition. Other tribes are unrecognized because they no longer exist as an organized group or because they have not completed the certification process established by the government entities in question.

Some federally recognized tribes are confederacies of more than one tribe. Historically, the State of California formed rancherias and Nevada formed Indian Colonies. Multi-ethnic entities were formed by the U.S. federal government or by treaty with the U.S. government for the purpose of being assigned to reservations. For example, 19 tribes that existed in 1872 combined at that time to form the Colville Confederated Tribes, which is now the single federally recognized tribe, Colville Indian Reservation in Washington state.

Other uses

The international meaning of the English word tribe is a people organized with a non–state government, who typically claim descent from a common founder and who speaks the same language.

In addition to their status as legal entities, tribes have political, social, historical, and other aspects. The term is also used to refer to various groups of Native Americans bound together for social, political, or religious purposes. Tribes are typically characterized by distinct territory, and common language or dialect. Other characteristics include common culture and ethnicity.

Tribes are susceptible to overlapping external and internal definition. Whereas outsiders use their own definitions for what a tribe is, and who is a member, depending on the purpose, tribes may have their own definition of identity and membership. To the extent that many tribes are acknowledged as sovereign nations, the United States does recognize some limited rights of tribes to decide membership by their own criteria.

Terminology

"American Indian", or simply "Indian", are legal terms used by the U.S. Government to refer to Native Americans, but controversy exists over their usage. These terms are part of the official names of many tribes and organizations, including those run by Indigenous people, because of both the historical process and being common and preferred terms when the name was formalized. While some Indigenous peoples of the Americas are comfortable with the word "Indian", others believe it is pejorative by nature, or at least outdated, because it is not a word in any Indigenous language, it was imposed upon Indigenous people by colonists, and can lead to Native Americans being confused with "Indians" from India and other peoples from South Asia. "Native American" refers to Indigenous peoples of the United States and also includes peoples within the United States who are not American Indian, such as the Iñupiat, Aleut, and Yupik peoples. Indigenous peoples in Canada include the First Nations, Métis, and Inuit.

See also

 Aboriginal peoples in Canada
 Classification of Indigenous peoples of the Americas
 List of Alaska Native tribal entities
 List of federally recognized tribes in the United States
 List of federally recognized tribes by state (USA)
 List of unrecognized tribes in the United States
 Indian reservation/Indian colony
 (Urban) Indian reserve
 Native American name controversy
 State-recognized tribes in the United States
 Tribal council
 Tribal sovereignty

References

External links
 Cornell Law
 Federally Recognized Tribes and Resource for Native Americans
 U.S. Department of the Interior - Indian Affairs

Native American law